Hot Enough for June is a 1964 British spy comedy film directed by Ralph Thomas, and starring Dirk Bogarde with Sylva Koscina in her English film debut, Robert Morley and Leo McKern. It is based on the 1960 novel The Night of Wenceslas by Lionel Davidson. The film was cut by twenty minutes and retitled Agent  for the US release by the American distributor Central Distributing.

Part of a trend of spy films in the wake of the success of the James Bond series, its art director was Syd Cain, who had the same job on the first two Bond films. Koscina herself had been considered for the role of Tatiana Romanova in From Russia with Love.

Plot
Roger Allsop (John Le Mesurier) turns over some belongings to a clerk, who stows them in a drawer marked 007 before turning the identifying card over to read "deceased". Allsop and his superior, Colonel Cunliffe (Robert Morley), then discuss the necessity to send someone to pick up something behind the Iron Curtain.

Unemployed British writer Nicholas Whistler (Dirk Bogarde) is sent by the employment exchange to be interviewed by Cunliffe, supposedly for a job as a trainee executive for a glass company. Cunliffe discovers Whistler speaks Czech, and offers him an exorbitant salary, plus expenses.

Whistler is given puzzling instructions to meet someone who will respond to his remark, "Hot enough for June", by stating he should have been there in September, before being sent that very day to Prague on a "business" trip. On his arrival, he is assigned a beautiful driver and guide, Vlasta (Sylva Koscina). She drives him to inspect a glass factory, where he finally discovers the washroom attendant is his man. However, he has to come back another day to make contact without arousing suspicion.

That night, he takes Vlasta to dinner. Unbeknownst to him, she is an agent of the secret police. The communists know (though he himself does not yet realise it) that he is actually working for British intelligence, and keep him under surveillance. He and Vlasta spend the next day together as well. They are attracted to each other, and she invites him to stay the night at her surprisingly luxurious home.

When Whistler revisits the factory, the attendant gives him a piece of paper and informs him that he is a spy. Vlasta arranges to meet him secretly that night; she warns him to return to England immediately. However, when he returns to the hotel, Simenova (Leo McKern), the head of the secret police, is waiting. He presents Whistler with a stark choice: sign a confession or suffer a fatal accidental fall. Whistler manages to escape.

Evading a manhunt, he turns to the only person who might be willing to help him: Vlasta. When he reaches her house in the morning, however, he is shocked to find her seeing her father, Simenova, off to work. After Simenova leaves, Whistler confronts Vlasta. She offers to help him reach the British embassy, despite a cordon of communist agents. To demonstrate his good faith, he burns the slip of paper so that neither side can have it. Her plan almost succeeds, but by sheer bad luck, Simenova is leaving the embassy as Whistler approaches and recognises him, forcing him to flee once more. Finally, he reaches the embassy by knocking out a milkman and taking his place.

Cunliffe informs him that he is being exchanged for a spy the British have caught. At the airport, he is pleasantly surprised to find that Vlasta has been assigned to the trade mission in London and is departing on the same airliner.

Cast

 Dirk Bogarde as Nicholas Whistler
 Sylva Koscina as Vlasta Simenova
 Robert Morley as Colonel Cunliffe
 Leo McKern as Simenova
 Roger Delgado as Josef
 Derek Fowlds as Sun Bathing Man
 Amanda Grinling as Cunliffe's secretary
 Noel Harrison as Johnnie
 Philo Hauser as Vlcek
 John Junkin as Clerk in opening scene
 Gertan Klauber as Technician in the Czech glass factory
 John Le Mesurier as Roger Allsop
 Jill Melford as Lorna
 Derek Nimmo as Fred
 Richard Pasco as Plakov
 Eric Pohlmann as Galushka
 Alan Tilvern as Simenova's assistant
 Richard Vernon as Roddinghead
 Brook Williams as Leon
 Norman Bird as Employment exchange clerk (uncredited)
 Frank Finlay as British Embassy porter (uncredited)
 William Mervyn as Passenger on the plane (uncredited)
 Tiberio Mitri as the Milkman (uncredited)
 George Pravda as Pravelko (uncredited)
 John Standing as Men's Room attendant/British agent (uncredited)

Production
Film rights to Lionel Davidson's novel were originally bought by American producer Hal Wallis, who wanted to make the film with Laurence Harvey. However, Wallis and Harvey had a falling out and the rights went instead to Rank and producer Betty E. Box.

Dirk Bogarde was cast in the lead. However he then decided he did not want to, as he had just made The Servant (1963). Box and director Ralph Thomas were not unduly concerned as they did not feel Bogarde was ideal casting anyway, and approached Tom Courtenay instead. Courtney agreed, but then Bogarde changed his mind again after his manager told him he needed the money.

Shooting took place in Padua, representing Prague.

Ralph Thomas later said he made the film "because I thought the script was quite funny and I loved working with Dirk. It was still during the period when he was doing those sort of roles very well."

Reception
Howard Thompson of The New York Times was unimpressed, calling it "a slick, bland shuffling of drollery and suspense, not especially new, at least by now, nor really funny." He singled out one performance for praise: "Most of the real fun comes from the mouth of Robert Morley ..."

Kinematograph Weekly called the film a "money maker" at the British box office for 1964.

References

External links
 
 

1964 films
British spy comedy films
Cold War spy films
1960s English-language films
1960s spy comedy films
Films based on British novels
Films directed by Ralph Thomas
Films set in London
Films set in Prague
Films shot at Pinewood Studios
Films shot in Italy
Films scored by Angelo Francesco Lavagnino
1964 comedy films
Parody films based on James Bond films